The XRCO Awards are given by the American X-Rated Critics Organization annually to people working in adult entertainment and it is the only adult industry awards show reserved exclusively for industry members.

Once every calendar year, XRCO members are asked to submit their own nominations. Members do not have to vote in every award category, but they are asked only to vote in areas that they feel qualified in. The award ceremony usually takes place during the spring and no later than the first week of April. Some of the works and workers are inducted into the XRCO Hall of Fame during the awards.

The XRCO online archive is missing many results prior to 1993 and the site encourages visitors to send in older results. The awards have been called "an X-rated version of the Academy Awards" and "a combination high-school beer bash, Mardi gras and Frederick's of Hollywood lingerie show". They have also been referred to as the "critics' circle awards for porn".

In 2013, the XRCO Awards venue was changed from The Highlands nightclub to Supperclub LA when the former closed. In 2014, the XRCO Awards returned to the former Highlands venue now called OHM. The 2015 XRCO Awards were held at Lure nightclub in Hollywood on April 11. The 2016 XRCO Awards were held at OHM nightclub in Hollywood on June 22. The 2018 XRCO Awards were held at the Argyle nightclub in Hollywood on June 28. The 2019 XRCO Awards which took place at Boardner's on June 27.

History 
After the controversy and criticism of the best erotic scene victory for the movie Virginia in 1984 at the Adult Film Association of America (AFAA) awards, the X-Rated Critics Organization (XRCO) and its "Heart-On Awards", were founded. Jim Holliday was a founder and previously the honorary historian of the X-Rated Critics Organization. After Holliday's death, the position of XRCO Historian was temporarily filled by XRCO founding member Bill Margold until 2006.

The first XRCO Awards were presented on February 14, 1985, where Ginger Lynn won a "veritable Triple Crown: 'Best Female Performer', 'Video Vixen' and 'Starlet of the Year'". Until 1991, the awards were presented on Valentine's Day each year. The specific award categories at the XRCO Awards have changed over the years.

In March 2015, changes to the award program were announced. Citing the venue and date changes made in 2014, the event organizers announced that the awards show would be recorded and broadcast by the company Vrai Voyeur. Also announced was the debut of a new design for the award handed out to winners. The "iconic wooden heart on trophies" would be retired and be replaced with "something bigger and better than ever".

All in the Family Theme 
 2016: The Father Figure (Digital Sin/Tabu Tales)
 2017: Me, My Brother and Another (New Sensations)
 2018: Dysfucktional: Blood Is Thicker Than Cum (Kelly Madison/Juicy)
 2019: A Trailer Park Taboo (Pure Taboo/Pulse)
 2020:  My Stepson Is Evil (Evil Angel Films)

Best 3D Release 
 2012: This Ain't Ghostbusters XXX (Hustler Video)

Best Actor (Single Performance)

Best Actress (Single Performance)

Best Adult Web Site

Best Amateur or Pro-Am Series

Best Anal or D.P. Sex Scene

Best Anal Series

Best Comedy or Parody

2004-2010

2011-2016

Comedy

Drama

Comic

2017-present

Comedy

Parody

Best Cumback

Best Director

Best DVD Extras 
 2006: Camp Cuddly Pines Powertool Massacre

Best Ethnic/Interracial/Blended Series

Best: Girl-Girl Sex Scene 

Note: A "Best Girl-Girl Release" category was created in 2005. No "Best Girl-Girl Scene" awards have been given out since.

Best Girl-Girl Release or Series

Best Gonzo Release

Best Gonzo Series

Best Group Sex Scene

Best Male-Female (Couples) Sex Scene

Best Mini-Feature Series 
 1993: Sodomania
 1994: Sodomania

Best On-Screen Chemistry 

 2007: (Fashionistas Safado: The Challenge)
 Gianna
 Jenna Haze
 Rocco
 2008:
 James Deen
 Joanna Angel
 2009:
 James Deen
 Joanna Angel

Best POV Release or Series 
 2007: Jack's POV 5 (Digital Playground)
 2008: inTERActive (Teravision/Hustler)
 2009: Tunnel Vision 3 (Jules Jordan Productions)
 2010: (tie) POV Jugg Fuckers 2 (Darkko Productions/Evil Angel) and POV Pervert 11 (Mike John Productions/Jules Jordan Video)
 2011: POV Pervert (Mike John Productions/Jules Jordan Video)
 2012: POV Pervert (Mike John Productions/Jules Jordan Video)
 2013: POV Pervert (Mike John/Jules Jordan)
 2015: POV Pervert (Mike John/Jules Jordan)
 2016: Lex's Point of View (Evil Angel)
 2017: POV Sluts (Toni Ribas/Evil Angel)
 2018: Bang POV (Bang Bros)

Best Release 
 2006: Pirates (Digital Playground/Adam & Eve)
 2007: Curse Eternal (Wicked Pictures)
 2008: Babysitters (Digital Playground)
 2009: Cheerleaders (Digital Playground)
 2010: Flight Attendants (X-Play/Adam & Eve Pictures)
 2011: Pornstar Superheroes (Elegant Angel)
 2012: Lost and Found (New Sensations)
 2013: Wasteland (Elegant Angel Productions)
 2014: The Submission of Emma Marx (New Sensations)
 2015: Second Chances (New Sensations)
 2016: Being Riley (Tushy/Jules Jordan Video)
 2017: Preacher’s Daughter (Wicked Pictures)
 2018: The Submission of Emma Marx: Evolved (New Sensations)
 2019: Abigail (Tushy)
 2020: Drive (Deeper/Pulse)

Before the 2006 awards, separate categories existed for film, video and DVD.

Best Epic 
 2006: Pirates (Digital Playground/Adam & Eve)
 2007: Corruption (Sex Z Pictures)
 2008: Upload (Sex Z Pictures)
 2009: (tie) Fallen (Wicked Pictures) and Pirates II: Stagnetti's Revenge (Digital Playground)
 2010: 2040 (Wicked Pictures)
 2011: Speed (Wicked Pictures)
 2012: Portrait of a Call Girl (Elegant Angel)
 2013: Voracious: The First Season (John Stagliano/Evil Angel)
 2014: Underworld (Wicked Pictures)
 2015: Wetwork (Vivid)
 2016: Wanted (Wicked Pictures/Adam & Eve)

DVD of the Year 
 2001: Dream Quest
 2002: Dark Angels: Special Edition
 2003: Euphoria
 2004: The Fashionistas (Evil Angel)
 2005: Millionaire (Private U.S.A./Pure Play Media)

Best Feature Film of the Year

Best Video Feature of the Year

Best Screenplay 
 1984: Every Woman Has A Fantasy
 1985: Taboo American Style
 1988: Deep Throat II (Michael Evans)

Best Series 
 1996: Joey Silvera's Butt Row

Best Supporting Actor 
 1984: Joey Silvera (Public Affairs)
 1985: Joey Silvera (She's So Fine)

Best Supporting Actress 
 1984: Sharon Kane (Throat: 12 Years After)
 1985: Kimberly Carson (Girls On Fire)

Best Threeway Sex Scene

Best Vignette Series 
 1995: The Voyeur

Deep Throat Award 
 2009: Angelina Valentine

Female Performer of the Year

Girl/Girl or Lesbian Performer of the Year

Kinky Scene 
 1984: (Insatiable II)
 Jamie Gillis
 Marilyn Chambers
 1985: (Nasty)
 Gayle Sterling
 Jamie Gillis
 Lynx Canon

Mainstream Adult Media Favorite

Male Performer of the Year

MILF of the Year

Most Outrageous DVD Extras 
 2007: Corruption (Sex Z Pictures)
 2008: Upload (Sex Z Pictures)
 2009: Pirates II: Stagnetti's Revenge (Digital Playground)
 2010: 2040 (Wicked Pictures)
 2011: Speed (Wicked Pictures)

New Starlet

New Stud

Oral Scene 
 1984: (Succulent)
 Little Oral Annie
 Ron Jeremy
 1985: (Love Bites)
 Amber Lynn
 Peter North
 Rick Savage

Orgasmic or Awesome Analist

Orgasmic Oralist

Star Showcase

Superslut

Teen or Cream Dream

Trans Performer of the Year

Unsung Siren

Unsung Swordsman

Woodsman of the Year 
 1993: Sean Michaels
 1994: Alex Sanders
 1995: T. T. Boy

Worst Movie 
 1993: Nympho Zombie Coeds
 1994: Gum-Me-Bare
 1995: World's Biggest Gang Bang
 1996: Frankenpenis
 1997: 87 And Still Bangin'''
 1999: World's Biggest Anal Gangbang 2000: The Vomitorium 2001: Watch Me Camp Bitch! 2002: Fossil Fuckers 2003: You're Never Too Old to Gangbang''

References

External links 

American pornographic film awards
Awards established in 1985
1985 establishments in the United States